Actiance Inc (formerly known as FaceTime Communications) was an American-based multinational corporation that developed the platforms required to enable the security, management and compliance of unified communications, Web 2.0 and social media channels. Headquartered in Redwood City, California, Actiance supported all leading social networks, unified communications providers and Instant Messaging platforms, including Facebook, LinkedIn, Twitter, AOL, Google, Yahoo!, Skype, Microsoft, IBM and Cisco.

History

1997–2007 
Actiance was established in 1997, Actiance provided call centre and CRM enablement for instant messaging, web chat and email. Working with AOL, Yahoo!, MSN and Microsoft, Actiance established the industry's first CAP agreements (Certified Access Programs), providing enhanced access to the public IM networks. In 2000, Actiance was awarded "Most Innovative Use of Real-time Collaboration" at the Microsoft Exchange Conference.

In 2001, the company launched its first compliance and security solution for IM networks, IM Auditor. Aimed specifically at the financial services sector that needed to comply with government regulations enabled financial services organizations to leverage the power of public instant messaging networks from AOL, Microsoft and Yahoo! for time-sensitive communications while ensuring administrative controls were in place to comply with government regulations.

By 2003, over 50% of the top 100 financial services firms worldwide that needed to comply with Securities and Exchange Commission and NASD record retention and supervisory requirements were using IM Auditor.

In 2004, Actiance introduced the Real Time Guardian (RTG), a gateway for filtering unauthorised IM connections and ceasing peer-to-peer (P2P) file sharing on sites such as KaZaA, Grokster and Morpheus. Actiance added features to RTG, including support for unified communication platforms such as Microsoft Office Communications Server and IBM Lotus Sametime. In 2005, a zero day defence system was added.

2008  present 
In 2008, Actiance added new capabilities to RTG’s successor, Unified Security Gateway (USG), providing IT managers with management, security and control over 140 social networking sites, 20,000 individual Facebook widgets and over 400 Web and real-time applications. Making USG the first secure Web gateway to combine content monitoring, management and security of Web 2.0 applications, such as social networks, instant messaging and Unified Communications, with URL filtering, malware and Web antivirus protection.

2010 saw another first for Actiance when it launched Vantage, IMAuditor’s successor, which included stringent security and compliance controls for Skype in the enterprise. Vantage provides granular security, policy controls, and compliance features for real-time and unified communications (UC) – providing management for the widest variety of UC and real-time communications platforms; including Microsoft Office Communications Server, and IBM Lotus Sametime, public instant messaging platforms such as Windows Live and Skype, web conferencing and industry-focused networks like Reuters, Bloomberg, and YellowJacket. Later that same year ,it includes support for Microsoft Lync Server.

Also in 2010, Actiance launched Socialite Enable, security, management, and compliance solution for enterprises using social networks. Socialite provides granular control of applications such as Facebook, LinkedIn and Twitter, and allows organizations to comply with regulatory compliance demanded by organizations such as the Financial Industry Regulatory Authority (FINRA) and the Financial Services Authority. As both a software-as-a-service deployment (SaaS) or as an on-premises installation as a module of USG, Socialite Enable allows for organizations to control social media features and communications for users both on the corporate network and situated remotely.

In January 2011, FaceTime Communications announced it had changed its name to Actiance following the purchase of the FaceTime brand by Apple.

In June 2011, Actiance announced Socialite Engage, a new platform that allows distributed teams to share content, engage with clients and prospects, and analyze the impact of the content on social media sites. Designed specifically to enable investment and insurance professionals to distribute pre-approved content, Socialite Engage enables any organization to manage social media in a secure and compliant environment, while allowing users to see at a glance which content had the most impact. It also leverages third-party data sources, such as internal systems and data feeds, highlights channels that are the most effective and identify potential sales leads.

In 2017, Actiance merged with the Portland company Smarsh, which provides archiving solutions for compliance and risk management. Both companies are currently being owned by K1 Investment Management.

References

External links 
 

Data security
Unified communications
Social media companies
Companies based in Redwood City, California